Innes Chonnel Castle or Ardchonnel Castle is a ruined 13th-century castle on Innis Chonnell, an island on Loch Awe near Dalavich, Argyll and Bute, Scotland. It was once a stronghold of Clan Campbell.

The castle and the island are jointly a designated scheduled monument.

References

Royal Commission on the Ancient and Historical Monuments of Scotland listing - Innes Chonnel Castle, CANMORE

Ruined castles in Argyll and Bute
Scheduled Ancient Monuments in Argyll and Bute
Lowland castles